Hubei Istar Football Club is a professional Chinese football club that currently participates in the China League Two. The team is based in Wuhan, Hubei.

History
Wuhan Chufeng Heli F.C. was founded on 8 July 2016 combined by amateur club Wuhan New Era and unpunished players from Wuhan Hongxing after the Wuhan Hongxing–Jiangsu Suning brawl. They played in the 2016 China Amateur Football League and won the winners of 2016 Wuhan City Super League and the first place of northwest region final–group B successively. Wuhan Chufeng Heli finished third place in the national finals and won the qualification for promoting to 2017 China League Two, but then gave up to turn professional and remained at the amateur league. Two years later, they finally promoted to China League Two after finishing in third place again in 2018 Chinese Champions League, after changing their name to Hubei Chufeng United F.C. before the season.

In January 2021, Hubei Chufeng United changed their name to Hubei Istar F.C.

Name history
2016–2018 Wuhan Chufeng Heli F.C. 武汉楚风合力
2018–2020 Hubei Chufeng United F.C. 湖北楚风合力
2021– Hubei Istar F.C. 湖北青年星

Players

Current squad

Coaching staff

Managerial history
  Zhou Yi (2016)
  Deng Sheng (2017)
  Huang Zhengguo (2018)
  Luíz Felipe (2019–)

Results
All-time league rankings

As of the end of 2019 season.

 In group stage.

Key
 Pld = Played
 W = Games won
 D = Games drawn
 L = Games lost
 F = Goals for
 A = Goals against
 Pts = Points
 Pos = Final position

 DNQ = Did not qualify
 DNE = Did not enter
 NH = Not Held
 WD = Withdrawal
 – = Does Not Exist
 R1 = Round 1
 R2 = Round 2
 R3 = Round 3
 R4 = Round 4

 F = Final
 SF = Semi-finals
 QF = Quarter-finals
 R16 = Round of 16
 Group = Group stage
 GS2 = Second Group stage
 QR1 = First Qualifying Round
 QR2 = Second Qualifying Round
 QR3 = Third Qualifying Round

References

Football clubs in China
Association football clubs established in 2016
Sport in Wuhan
2016 establishments in China